The Brazilian Navy has three hospital ships, officially called Infirmary Assistance Ship (Navio de Assistência Hospitalar, in Portuguese), which are designed specifically to provide medical assistance on rivers having shallow waters. 

They have a helipad and carry two launches that can extend the vessels' reach into even shallower and narrower waters than the parent vessels can access. The vessels have two sickbays with a total of six berths, an operating theater, up to three dental offices, a laboratory, two clinics, and X-ray facilities.

U-16 Doutor Montenegro
U-18 Oswaldo Cruz
U-19 Carlos Chagas

The vessels' main characteristics are:
     
Length: 47.18 meters
Beam: 8.45 meters
Depth: 2.90 meters; maximum draught—1.75 meters
Full load displacement: 500 tons
Cruising speed: 9 knots
Range: 4,000 miles
Personnel: 4 officers, 6 doctors and a dentist, 15 technical health personnel, and 21 enlisted men.

See also
 Ships of the Brazilian Navy

Hospital
Hospital ships
Hospital ships